Gareth Howell (born 6 January 1981) is a British racing driver, and multiple British Touring Car Championship race winner from 2000 to 2008.

Career
Howell drove his first kart aged 4 and began his racing career aged 8. He is a former British karting champion and European Cup winner, who finished 8th in the World Finals in 1995 from 35th on the grid setting fastest lap on the way. During his karting career he raced alongside Jenson Button, Dan Wheldon, and his Zip Kart teammates Anthony Davidson and Gary Paffett.

At the age of 10, he told a TV programme that he wanted to race in the BTCC (not mentioning Formula One, which is a bigger draw for most star-struck youngsters).

At age 16 he graduated to the Fiesta si Championship and in 1998 moved up to the BTCC supporting Ford Credit Fiesta Championship. In 1998 he became the youngest race winner in the 20-year history of the Championship aged just 18. He was then runner up in the 2000 championship and winner of the Junior Cup. His prize involved a test for the works Ford Mondeo BTCC super touring team, where he recorded a faster laptime that his Fiesta peers. He made occasional appearances in the 2000 season for GR Motorsport in a Ford Focus, running in the Production class, which was known as Class B at the time. 2001 was his first full season, being part of a four-car GR Motorsport entry into the Production Class. He finished fifth overall in his class, having taken a race win in round 16 of the series at Snetterton.

In 2002 he graduated to the main division of the championship, driving an MG ZS for Team Atomic Kitten run by established touring car outfit West Surrey Racing joined by fellow debutant Colin Turkington.

Despite outperforming and outscoring Turkington, at the end of the season he was dropped from the MG program because of funding, and found himself without a full-time drive for the 2003 season. He managed to secure a number of outings during the year, including at Silverstone as team-mate to Gavin Pyper at GA Motorsport, piloting a Vauxhall Astra Coupé. He completed the final 4 two-race rounds of the championship for Team Dynamics, also in a Vauxhall, scoring 2 Independent's Cup wins.

He was planned to race for Dynamics in 2004, but after Vic Lee's team closed, Dan Eaves and his Halfords sponsorship replaced him. Howell sat out the 2004 and much of the 2005 seasons due to a lack of finance. Keen to remain with the team, he held Dan's pitboard for most of 2004.

He finally made his series return at Knockhill for Team Dynamics towards the end of 2005. He drove the team's third Honda Integra DC05 in three race weekends alongside the team's existing drivers Matt Neal and Eaves, setting pole position and taking his debut BTCC win at Silverstone, where he also set fastest lap (and holds the lap record on the National Circuit. He had hoped to continue for Team Dynamics into 2006, but because of lack of funding he instead only raced in the final four rounds of the season.

At the final meeting of 2006 on the Silverstone National Circuit, Howell qualified on pole, and won the first race, before battling through the field in the third race for another victory.

For 2007, Howell wanted a full-time drive. He signed to drive a SEAT Toledo for Motorbase Performance, scoring the team's best result in finishing 5th in a 3-year-old car. He left the team mid-season, explaining that "It's a vicious circle. We needed to develop the car through testing to get further towards the front and out of the midfield melee, but we came back from each round with so much damage that then took all the time between races to repair. We'd then go out and experience the same problem all over again."

He started 2008 without a drive, but joined BTC Racing as their test and reserve driver early in the season. He races at Thruxton and Oulton Park in place of regular driver Stuart Oliver, in the same SEAT as he drove in 2007, however he scored no points and was eliminated from both meetings before the final races.

In 2008, Howell worked with Lipscomb Abarth racing an Abarth 500.

On Saturday 3 April 2008 at Oulton Park, Howell won the first ever Zing Trofeo Abarth 500 GB with a gap of 2.693 seconds.

Away from racing, from 2010-2020 Howell has worked as a test driver for McLaren Automotive, developing their supercar range. He now works as Chief Test Driver for Gordon Murray Automotive.

He is married to Laura, has a daughter called Lily, and a son called Josh.

Racing record

Complete British Touring Car Championship results
(key) Races in bold indicate pole position (1 point awarded 2000–2002 all races, 2003–present just for first race, 2000–2001 in class) Races in italics indicate fastest lap (1 point awarded – 2001–present all races, 2000–2001 in class)  * signifies that driver lead race for at least one lap (1 point given 2001–2002 just for feature race, 2003–present all races, 2001 for leading in class)

Britcar 24 Hour results

References

External links
Official website
Profile at BTCCPages.com
Profile
Gareth Howell and Lipscomb win first Zing Trofeo Abarth Race
Gareth Howell's blog

British Touring Car Championship drivers
1981 births
British racing drivers
Living people
Porsche Carrera Cup GB drivers